Walter Marks may refer to:

 Walter Marks (composer) (born 1934), American songwriter, playwright, screenwriter, and novelist
 Walter Marks (politician) (1875–1951), Australian lawyer, yachtsman, and politician
 Walter E. Marks (1905–1992), American football, basketball, and baseball player, coach and college athletics administrator